The 1880 New Jersey gubernatorial election was held on November 2, 1880. Democratic nominee George C. Ludlow defeated Republican nominee Frederic A. Potts with 49.53% of the vote.

General election

Candidates
Thomas B. Hoxey, nominee for Governor in 1877 (Greenback)
George C. Ludlow, State Senator for Middlesex County (Democratic)
Frederic A. Potts, former State Senator for Hunterdon County and candidate for U.S. Representative in 1872 and 1878 (Republican)
Stephen B. Ransom (Prohibition)

Results

References

1880
New Jersey
Gubernatorial
November 1880 events